Orsi Instrument Company, sometimes called Orsi Instruments or commonly just Orsi, is an Italian manufacturer of musical instruments, especially brass instruments. Its traditional logo is a galloping horse.

History

Professor Romeo Orsi joined Paolo Maino's factory and founded the Maino & Orsi company. They have been producing musical instruments since 1836. The factory is currently based in Tradate, Italy.

See also 

List of Italian companies

External links
Prof. Romeo Orsi - unico produttore di tutti gli strumenti a fiato

Clarinet manufacturing companies
Oboe manufacturing companies
Musical instrument manufacturing companies of Italy
Italian brands
Manufacturing companies established in 1836
Italian companies established in 1836